Leucadendron rubrum, the spinning top, is a flower-bearing shrub belonging to the genus Leucadendron and forms part of the fynbos. The plant is native to the Western Cape, South Africa.

Description

Fire destroys the plant but the seeds survive. The seeds are stored in a toll on the female plant and are released where they are spread by the wind. The seed has a parachute mechanism that allows it to float and rotate through the air. The plant is unisexual and there are male and female plants that reproduce by wind pollination.

Distribution and habitat
The plant occurs in the Bokkeveld, Gifberg, Cederberg to the Hottentots Holland Mountains and Riviersonderend Mountains, Touwsberg, Rooiberg, Kammanassie Mountains, Piketberg, Table Mountain, and the Cape Flats.

Gallery

References

http://pza.sanbi.org/leucadendron-rubrum
http://biodiversityexplorer.info/plants/proteaceae/leucadendron_rubrum.htm
http://redlist.sanbi.org/species.php?species=794-115
https://www.proteaatlas.org.za/conebu4.htm

rubrum
Taxa named by Nicolaas Laurens Burman